Rangsam Intharachai (born 1 August 1959) is a Thai sprinter. He competed in the men's 4 × 100 metres relay at the 1984 Summer Olympics.

Notes

References

1959 births
Living people
Athletes (track and field) at the 1984 Summer Olympics
Rangsam Intharachai
Rangsam Intharachai
Place of birth missing (living people)
Rangsam Intharachai